Arhopala eucolpis is a butterfly in the family Lycaenidae. It was described by Theodor Franz Wilhelm Kirsch in 1877. It is found in the Australasian realm.

Subspecies
Arhopala eucolpis eucolpis (Waigeu, Misool, Jobi, West Irian to Papua, Goodenough, Yela, Tagula)
Arhopala eucolpis sudesta (Evans, 1957) (Tagula, Yela)

References

External links
Arhopala Boisduval, 1832 at Markku Savela's Lepidoptera and Some Other Life Forms. Retrieved June 3, 2017.

Arhopala
Butterflies described in 1877
Butterflies of Oceania
Butterflies of Asia